Essington Hall was a plantation and  historic house on Old Mount Oak Road in Mitchellville, Maryland that encompassed much of the area.  It was owned by John Mitchell, for whom the locality of Mitchellville was named.

The house was destroyed by 1974 but the cemetery remains and is maintained by the city of Bowie, Maryland.

References

External links

Historic American Buildings Survey in Maryland
Houses in Prince George's County, Maryland
Plantation houses in Maryland
Buildings and structures demolished in 1974